Julio Briones (born July 1, 1975) is a football midfielder from Ecuador. He earned one cap for the Ecuador national team during his career. His only appearance for the squad came on October 14, 1998, when Ecuador lost 5-1 in a friendly match against Brazil. Briones was a second-half substitute for Héctor Carabalí.

References

1975 births
Living people
Ecuadorian footballers
Ecuador international footballers
Association football midfielders
Delfín S.C. footballers
Manta F.C. footballers